Shoes.com (previously known as ShoeBuy.com) is an American footwear retailer. The website was established in Boston during 1999. In 2006, the company was acquired by IAC. In December 2016, Jet.com (a subsidiary of Walmart) completed the acquisition of ShoeBuy from IAC. It was reported that Walmart paid US$70 million for the company. As of 2017, Shoes.com contains over one million products, many which can also be purchased on Jet.com. ShoeBuy was re-branded as Shoes.com shortly after the acquisition closed.

In October 2020, Walmart sold Shoes.com to CriticalPoint Capital, a private equity firm, for an undisclosed amount.

References 

Walmart
Companies based in Boston
Online retailers of the United States
American companies established in 1999
Retail companies established in 1999
Internet properties established in 1999
2016 mergers and acquisitions
2020 mergers and acquisitions
Footwear retailers of the United States
1999 establishments in Massachusetts